Devils Thumb, also known as Manjal Jimalji by the Eastern Kuku Yalanji, is a mountain located near Mossman within the Daintree National Park, Far North Queensland, Australia.
The Manjal Jamalji trail is a difficult 10.6-kilometre return trail to the peak which takes approximately eight hours.

See also

 List of mountains of Australia

References

Mountains of Queensland